Furth im Wald station is a railway station in the municipality of Furth im Wald, located in the Cham district in Bavaria, Germany.

References

Railway stations in Bavaria
Buildings and structures in Cham (district)